Rampi may refer to:

Rampi language, a language of Sulawesi, Indonesia

People with the surname
Alfredo Rampi (1975–1981)
Francesco Rampi (born 1991), Italian footballer

Italian-language surnames